KNSI (1450 AM/99.3 FM) is a commercial radio station based in St. Cloud, Minnesota.  It is owned by Leighton Broadcasting, which also owns KCLD-FM, KZPK and KCML.

KNSI is also carried on HD Radio, via KZPK-HD2.

Programming
KNSI has a variety of news and talk programming dealing with news, current events, politics, sports, and more.  Its signature live and local show is Ox In The Afternoon which airs weekday afternoons from 2-5 PM. KNSI also airs many syndicated talk show hosts such as Rush Limbaugh and Dave Ramsey.

In the summer of 2006 it was announced that KNSI would become the broadcast station of SCSU football and men's and women's basketball while continuing the broadcasting of men's hockey beginning with the 2006-2007 seasons. In 2014, the station announced that Husky Hockey coverage would move to sister station KCML for the 2014-15 season while KNSI broadcasts men's and women's basketball.

The station carried the KCLD call sign from 1975 to 1981 and 1988 to 1990. The station is rebroadcast on translator K257GK (99.3 FM).

History
The station was first licensed in 1938 as KFAM on 1420 kHz. The call letters recalled an earlier St. Cloud station, WFAM, owned by the Times Publishing Company and the St. Cloud Daily Times, which had been first licensed in June 1922 and deleted in the summer of 1928. In 1941, under the provisions of the North American Regional Broadcasting Agreement, KFAM moved to its current frequency of 1450 kHz. In 1948 it was joined by a sister station, KFAM-FM (now KCLD-FM). The two stations  were sold to Alvar Leighton in 1975.

References

External links
KNSI website
Leighton Broadcasting
KNSI News on Forth

Radio stations in St. Cloud, Minnesota
News and talk radio stations in the United States
Radio stations established in 1948